The National Theatre in Iraq was opened during the Saddam Hussein era and closed during the 2003 Iraq War.  According to the Telegraph, the theatre re-opened in 2009 with reinforced blast walls to protect against terrorist attacks.  According to Al Arabiya News, the theatre has 1000 seats and cost 10,000 Iraqi Dinars to attend.

References

See also
 
 

National theatres
Theatres in Iraq